This is a list of earthquakes in 1943. Only magnitude 6.0 or greater earthquakes appear on the list. Lower magnitude events are included if they have caused death, injury, or damage. Events which occurred in remote areas will be excluded from the list as they wouldn't have generated significant media interest. All dates are listed according to UTC time. The planet experienced an unusually busy year, with twenty-nine earthquakes that reached 7.0 or greater. The largest occurred in Chile and measured a magnitude of 8.1, but Dutch East Indies, the Philippines, Turkey, the United States, Japan and Russia all had large events above magnitude 7.0. The year was characterised by a number of quakes that caused substantial deaths. Faring worst was Turkey, which had three separate deadly events, including the deadliest of the year in November. Japan had an earthquake in September which caused 1,400 deaths.

Overall

By death toll 

 Note: At least 10 casualties

By magnitude 

 Note: At least 7.0 magnitude

Notable events

January

February

March

April

May

June

July

August

September

October

November

December

References

1943
 
1943